In geometry, a W-curve is a curve in projective n-space that is invariant under a 1-parameter group of projective transformations. W-curves were first investigated by Felix Klein and Sophus Lie in 1871, who also named them.  W-curves in the real projective plane can be constructed with straightedge alone.  Many well-known curves are W-curves, among them conics, logarithmic spirals, powers (like y = x3), logarithms and the helix, but not e.g. the sine.  W-curves occur widely in the realm of plants.

Name
The 'W' stands for the German 'Wurf' – a throw – which in this context refers to a series of four points on a line. A 1-dimensional W-curve (read: the motion of a point on a projective line) is determined by such a series.

The German "W-Kurve" sounds almost exactly like "Weg-Kurve" and the last can be translated by "path curve". That is why in the English literature one often finds "path curve" or "pathcurve".

See also
 Homography

Further reading
 Felix Klein and Sophus Lie: Ueber diejenigen ebenen Curven... in Mathematische Annalen, Band 4, 1871; online available at the University of Goettingen
 For an introduction on W-curves and how to draw them, see Lawrence Edwards Projective Geometry, Floris Books 2003, 
 On the occurrence of W-curves in nature see Lawrence Edwards The vortex of life, Floris Books 1993, 
 For an algebraic classification of 2- and 3-dimensional W-curves see Classification of pathcurves
 Georg Scheffers (1903) "Besondere transzendente Kurven", Klein's encyclopedia Band 3–3.

Curves
Projective geometry